Rav Papi (or Rav Pappai)  was an Babylonian rabbi, of the fifth generation of amoraim.

Biography
Rav Papi was the son-in-law of Rabbi Isaac Nappaha, while his main rabbi was Rava, and he repeats many teachings in Rava's name. He was a colleague and an opponent of Rav Papa and Rav Huna b. Joshua. His students include Rav Ashi and Ravina I.

References

Talmud rabbis of Babylonia